Northeastern Illinois Golden Eagles men's basketball formerly represented Northeastern Illinois University in intercollegiate men's basketball. The team participated in NCAA Division I beginning with the 1990–91 season.

The squad briefly joined the East Coast Conference before moving to the Mid-Continent Conference from 1994–98. At the end of the 1997–98 academic year, the university's administration disbanded the athletic department.

Leading players of this era included high-scoring guard Reggie Smith (1992–94), imposing center Monte O'Quinn (1992–96). Another guard, Andrell Hoard (1995–97), won the 1997 ESPN National Slam Dunk Championship. Guard Victor Snipes (1991–93) led NCAA Division I in steals per game as sophomore in 1991–92.

Record by year

Conference tournament history

East Coast Conference

Mid-Continent Conference

Head coaching history

References

External links
 https://web.archive.org/web/20121106040357/https://www.nmnathletics.com/pdf7/78574.pdf
 https://www.sports-reference.com/cbb/schools/NEIL/